Robert Brian Skinstad (born 3 July 1976) is a former rugby union professional player who has represented the South African national team, the Springboks. He played in the positions of flanker and number eight.

Education
Skinstad lived in Kloof, KwaZulu-Natal while he attended Highbury Preparatory School, he also attended Fores in Rondebosch, before boarding at Hilton College. His university studies took him to Stellenbosch University where he lived in the Simonsberg men's residence and captained the 'Maties' (University) 1st side.

Early career
Skinstad was selected by Western Province for the Currie Cup and Super 12, and went on to captain both sides. 
He then moved to Johannesburg and played the 2003 season for the Golden Lions (Currie Cup) and the Cats (Super 12) before leaving for the United Kingdom.

Skinstad was eligible to represent 3 countries at international level: Zimbabwe, South Africa and Ireland, through his Irish mother Alana who hails from County Louth.

Springboks

Having represented South Africa at all levels, including captaining the under 21 Springbok side in 1996 and 1997, and playing for the SA Sevens team in 1997, Skinstad made his début for the Springboks as a replacement on 29 November 1997 against England. In all he played 42 tests for the Springboks, scoring 11 tries.

His inclusion in the 1999 World Cup squad at the expense of successful captain Gary Teichmann was highly controversial in South Africa, and although South Africa finished third in the competition there were many who believed that Teichmann should have been retained as captain for that tournament. Skinstad carried a leg injury into the competition, and made little impression.

Skinstad captained the Springboks in 12 tests, since 24 October 2003.

Semi-retirement in Britain
In January 2004 Skinstad terminated his contract with SA Rugby and signed with Newport Gwent Dragons in Wales, for whom he played just 9 games. He then worked with a group, including businessmen Johann Rupert and Wayne Huizenga trying to take over an English club in London and played part-time for Richmond in England's London South-East Division 1. He was also a regular player for the Barbarians and has captained them on several occasions. 
In December 2006 Bob played alongside his friend, former Scottish international Kenny Logan in the Dubai 7's for 'Stefan BHF' to raise awareness for the British Heart Foundation in memory of the late Stefan Czerpak, ex England colts Newbury RFC and Richmond RFC rugby coach who died in 1998 from a heart attack.

Skinstad started his own sports management company, Esportif, as a joint venture with Saatchi & Saatchi based in their London headquarters. He has worked as an analyst and occasional presenter covering the Super 14, Currie Cup and NPC Tournaments for Sky Sports.

Return to South Africa
After months of speculation about a return to professional rugby, Skinstad returned to Super 14 rugby in 2007 playing for the Sharks. He made his return coming off the bench against the Highlanders in New Zealand, and went on to make another 9 appearances, including a substitute's role in the final. 
He was rewarded with a recall to the Springbok training camp in May 2007, and when Danie Rossouw was taken ill, Skinstad was named on the bench for the second test against England on 2 June, continuing a remarkable comeback. He then was chosen as captain for the Boks' 2007 Tri Nations match against Australia on 7 July, when coach Jake White rested several senior players in preparation for the World Cup. An experienced Boks side took a surprising 17–0 lead before fading to lose 25–17. 
Despite suffering a broken rib in the Australia match, Skinstad would see his comeback capped off on 21 July with selection to the South Africa squad for the 2007 Rugby World Cup. He only played and captained one full game in South Africa's winning campaign, and made three further appearances as a substitute.

He retired from professional rugby on 6 November 2007.

On 21 October 2013 Bob was appointed as Tourism Brand Ambassador for the Cape Whale Coast region in the Western Cape, South Africa. This region is made up of the following towns; Hermanus, Gansbaai, Stanford, Kleinmond and Hangklip.

Honours
Currie Cup: Winner (with Western Province) 1997, 2000, 2001. Finalist 1998
Superrugby (with Sharks): Finalist 2007. 
Tri-Nations: Winner (with Springboks) 1998
World Cup: Winner (with Springboks) 2007. 3rd place with Springboks 1999

References

External links

SA Rugby Hall of Fame profile
Newport Gwent Dragons Official Site

1976 births
Living people
Sportspeople from Bulawayo
Zimbabwean people of British descent
Dragons RFC players
Golden Lions players
Lions (United Rugby Championship) players
Stormers players
Western Province (rugby union) players
Sharks (Currie Cup) players
Sharks (rugby union) players
South African rugby union players
South Africa international rugby union players
Barbarian F.C. players
Rugby union flankers
Rugby union number eights
Alumni of Hilton College (South Africa)
Alumni of Highbury Preparatory School
Richmond F.C. players
Zimbabwean emigrants to South Africa
White Rhodesian people
South African people of Irish descent
South African expatriate rugby union players
Expatriate rugby union players in Wales
Expatriate rugby union players in England
Zimbabwean expatriates in England
South Africa international rugby sevens players
Male rugby sevens players
Rugby sevens players at the 1998 Commonwealth Games
Commonwealth Games rugby sevens players of South Africa
Commonwealth Games competitors for South Africa